Bayana Junction railway station is a railway station in Bharatpur district, Rajasthan. Its code is BXN. It serves Bayana town. The station consists of 3 platforms. Passenger, Express, and Superfast trains halt here.

References

Railway stations in Bharatpur district
Kota railway division